Myaware, formerly the Myasthenia Gravis Association is the leading UK charity for people with myasthenia gravis, congenital myasthenia, Lambert–Eaton myasthenic syndrome (LEMS) and ocular myasthenia.

About
The charity was established May 1976. The charity supports people with myasthenia and their families, increase public and medical awareness of the condition and raise funds for research and support staff.

The charity’s head office is based in Derby.

Aim
The organization provides information, advice and support, particularly to people just diagnosed with the conditions.

References

External links
 Official website

Health charities in the United Kingdom
Neurology organizations